Maxwell, Ontario can refer to:

Maxwell, Grey County, Ontario
Maxwell, Hastings County, Ontario